Clepsis brunneotona is a species of moth of the family Tortricidae. It is found in Santa Catarina, Brazil.

The wingspan is about 17 mm. The ground colour of the forewings is cream ferruginous with brown spots and strigulae (fine streaks). The base of the wing and the costa are suffused with ferruginous and the markings are brown. The hindwings are cream, strigulated with pale grey.

Etymology
The species name refers to the brown shade of the forewing and is derived from Latin brunneus (meaning brown) and tonus (meaning tone, shade).

References

Moths described in 2010
Clepsis